Heldring is the name of a patrician family in the Netherlands.

History
The family history begins with Hans Hendrik Heldring, born around 1649, a German army captain. who came to the Netherlands in 1672 and died in 1710 in  Elburg. His descendants became important bankers, philanthropists and reverends.

The family history was published in the Nederland's Patriciaat series.

Notable members
Jérôme Louis Heldring
Ottho Gerhard Heldring

Literature
Nederland's Patriciaat 49 (1963), p. 181-196.
Inventory of the family archive

Dutch families
Dutch patrician families